In Greek mythology, Laomedon (means "ruler of the people") was a Trojan king, son of Ilus and thus nephew of Ganymede and Assaracus.

Family 
Laomedon's mother was variously identified as Eurydice, Leucippe or Batia. Thus, his possible siblings are Themiste, Telecleia and sometimes, even Tithonus.

He was the father of Priam, Lampus, Hicetaon, Clytius, Hesione, Cilla, Astyoche, Proclia, Aethilla, Medesicaste and Clytodora. Tithonus is also described by most sources as Laomedon's eldest legitimate son, and most sources omit Ganymede from the list of Laomedon's children, but indicate him as his uncle instead. Laomedon's possible wives are Placia, Strymo (or Rhoeo), Zeuxippe or Leucippe; by the former he begot Tithonus and by the latter King Priam (see John Tzetzes' Scholia in Lycophronem 18 : "Priamus was the son of Leucippe, whereas Tithonus was the son of Rhoeo or Strymo, the daughter of Scamander"). He also had a son named Bucolion by the nymph Calybe, as recounted by Homer in the Iliad. Dictys Cretensis added Thymoetes to the list of Laomedon's children.

Mythology

Magical horses 
Laomedon owned several horses with divine parentage that Zeus had given Tros (Laomedon's grandfather) as compensation for the kidnapping of Tros's son Ganymede. Anchises secretly bred his own mares from these horses.

According to one story, Ganymede was kidnapped by Zeus, who had seen the exceptional Virtue of the boy, as worthy only of Olympus, and ascended the young man into Heaven. Tros grieved for his son. Sympathetic, Zeus sent Hermes with two horses so swift they could run over water. Hermes also assured Tros that Ganymede was immortal and would be the cupbearer for the gods, a position of much distinction. Laomedon himself was the son of Ganymede's brother Ilus, the son of Tros.

Wrath of gods 
When Poseidon and Apollo entered a conspiracy to put Zeus in bonds, the supreme god being offended, sent them to serve with King Laomedon as punishment for their nefarious design. In other sources, the two gods simply tested the wantonness of the Laomedon. As ordered by Laomedon who promised wages, the two deities assuming the likeness of men undertook to build huge walls around the city. But when they had finished, the king refused to fulfill their agreement of reward. In vengeance, before the Trojan War, Apollo sent a pestilence to Troy while Poseidon released a sea monster which, carried up by a flood, snatched away the  people of the plain.

The oracles foretold deliverance from these calamities if Laomedon would expose his daughter Hesione to be devoured by the sea monster. The king then exposed her by fastening her to the rocks near the sea. But by chance, after fighting the Amazons, Heracles, who had landed at Troy, saw the girl to be sacrificed. The hero promised to save the princess on condition of receiving from Laomedon the mares which Zeus had given in compensation for the ascendance of Ganymede into Olympus to serve the Deities. When Laomedon agreed, Heracles (along with Oicles and Telamon) killed the monster and rescued Hesione at the last minute. But when Laomedon would not give up his magical horses for their deeds, the hero put to sea after threatening to make war on Troy.

Siege of Heracles 
After his servitude, Heracles mustered an army of noble volunteers and sailed for Ilium with eighteen ships of fifty oars each. Having come to port at Ilium, he left the guard of the ships to Oicles and he, with the rest of the champions, set out to attack the city. Meanwhile, Laomedon marched against the ships with a multitude and slew Oicles in battle. But being repulsed by the troops of Heracles, Laomedon was besieged. The siege once laid, Telamon was the first to breach the wall and enter the city, and after him Heracles. When the son of Zeus had taken the city he shot down Laomedon and his sons, except Podarces. Heracles assigned Hesione as a war prize to Telamon (by whom Telamon had a son called Teucer) and allowed her to take with her whomsoever of the captives she would. When Hesione chose Podarces, Heracles said that her brother must first be a slave and then be ransomed by her. So, when the prince was being sold, Hesione took the golden veil from her head and gave it as a ransom; hence Podarces was thereafter called Priam (from priamai 'to buy').

Genealogical tree

Notes

References 
Apollodorus and Hyginus (2007) Apollodorus' Library and Hyginus' Fabulae: Two Handbooks of Greek Mythology. Trans. R. Scott Smith and Stephen Trzaskoma. Indianapolis: Hackett Pub. .
Apollodorus, The Library with an English Translation by Sir James George Frazer, F.B.A., F.R.S. in 2 Volumes, Cambridge, MA, Harvard University Press; London, William Heinemann Ltd. 1921. ISBN 0-674-99135-4. Online version at the Perseus Digital Library. Greek text available from the same website.
Conon, Fifty Narrations, surviving as one-paragraph summaries in the Bibliotheca (Library) of Photius, Patriarch of Constantinople translated from the Greek by Brady Kiesling. Online version at the Topos Text Project.
Dictys Cretensis, from The Trojan War. The Chronicles of Dictys of Crete and Dares the Phrygian translated by Richard McIlwaine Frazer, Jr. (1931-). Indiana University Press. 1966. Online version at the Topos Text Project.
Dionysus of Halicarnassus, Roman Antiquities. English translation by Earnest Cary in the Loeb Classical Library, 7 volumes. Harvard University Press, 1937–1950. Online version at Bill Thayer's Web Site
Dionysius of Halicarnassus, Antiquitatum Romanarum quae supersunt, Vol I-IV. . Karl Jacoby. In Aedibus B.G. Teubneri. Leipzig. 1885. Greek text available at the Perseus Digital Library.
Homer, The Iliad with an English Translation by A.T. Murray, Ph.D. in two volumes. Cambridge, MA., Harvard University Press; London, William Heinemann, Ltd. 1924. . Online version at the Perseus Digital Library.
Homer, Homeri Opera in five volumes. Oxford, Oxford University Press. 1920. . Greek text available at the Perseus Digital Library.

Princes in Greek mythology
Mythological kings of Troy
Kings in Greek mythology
Metamorphoses characters
Deeds of Poseidon
Deeds of Apollo
Mythology of Heracles